Bergamosoma is a genus of millipedes belonging to the family Craspedosomatidae.

The species of this genus are found in Central Europe.

Species:
 Bergamosoma baldense (Verhoeff, 1934) 
 Bergamosoma bergomatium (Verhoeff, 1925)

References

Chordeumatida
Millipede genera